The Shire of Tullaroop was a local government area about  northwest of Melbourne, the state capital of Victoria, Australia, surrounding the regional centre of Maryborough. Maryborough itself was managed by a separate entity, ultimately known as the City of Maryborough. After a large-scale statewide amalgamation program by the Victorian Government in 1994, they were united under the Shire of Central Goldfields.

History

Tullaroop was incorporated as a road district on 18 January 1861, and became a shire on 24 January 1865.

Majorca Borough was originally known as Craigie Borough until 1876.

On 20 January 1995, the Shire of Tullaroop was abolished, and along with the City of Maryborough and parts of the Shire of Bet Bet and surrounding districts, was merged into the newly created Shire of Central Goldfields. The Laanecoorie Reservoir was merged into the newly created Shire of Loddon.

Ridings

The Shire of Tullaroop was divided into four ridings, each of which elected three councillors:
 Carisbrook Riding
 Charlotte Plains Riding
 Norwood Riding
 Rodborough Riding

Towns and localities
 Adelaide Lead
 Alma
 Bowenvale
 Carisbrook
 Craigie
 Eddington
 Havelock
 Majorca
 Moores Flat
 Moolort
 Moonlight Flat
 Rodborough
 Simson
 Wareek

Population

* Estimate in the 1958 Victorian Year Book.

References

External links
 Victorian Places - Tullaroop Shire

Tullaroop
1861 establishments in Australia